Umberto Colombo (21 May 1933 – 26 October 2021) was an Italian professional footballer who played as a midfielder.

Honours
Juventus
 Serie A: 1957–58, 1959–60, 1960–61

Atalanta
 Coppa Italia: 1962–63

References

External links
 

1933 births
2021 deaths
Italian footballers
Association football midfielders
Italy international footballers
Serie A players
A.C. Monza players
Juventus F.C. players
Atalanta B.C. players
Hellas Verona F.C. players
Sportspeople from Como
Footballers from Lombardy